Anton Karoukin is a Belarusian archer who participated at the 2010 Summer Youth Olympics in Singapore. He was eliminated in the first round of the individual event by eventual champion Ibrahim Sabry on a tiebreak. He paired up with Gloria Filippi of Italy and won gold in the mixed team event, defeating Zoi Paraskevopoulou of Greece and Gregor Rajh of Slovenia in the gold medal match.

He won the silver medal in the men's team recurve event at the 2022 European Indoor Archery Championships held in Laško, Slovenia.

References

 

Archers at the 2010 Summer Youth Olympics
Living people
Year of birth missing (living people)
Belarusian male archers
21st-century Belarusian people